Stugeta marmoreus, the marbled sapphire, is a butterfly in the family Lycaenidae. It was described by Arthur Gardiner Butler in 1866. It is found in Senegal, Burkina Faso, Guinea, Ivory Coast, Ghana, Nigeria, Sudan, Uganda and Kenya. The habitat consists of Sudan savanna.

Adults of both sexes are attracted to flowers.

The larvae feed on the young leaves of Ximenia americana, Ximenia caffra and possibly Loranthus species. They are green with red spots.

Subspecies
Stugeta marmoreus marmoreus (Senegal, Burkina Faso, northern Guinea, Ivory Coast, Ghana, northern Nigeria, southern Sudan, north-western Uganda) 
Stugeta marmoreus olalae Stoneham, 1934 (Uganda: Elgon area, Kenya: west to the southern and eastern slopes of Mount Elgon)

References

External links
Die Gross-Schmetterlinge der Erde 13: Die Afrikanischen Tagfalter. Plate XIII 68 c

Butterflies described in 1866
Iolaini
Butterflies of Africa
Taxa named by Arthur Gardiner Butler